Condrătești is a commune in Ungheni District, Moldova. It is composed of two villages, Condrătești and Curtoaia.

References

Communes of Ungheni District